Operation Vigorous (known in Italy as  1942, "the Battle of mid-June 1942") was a British operation during the Second World War, to escort supply convoy MW11 from the eastern Mediterranean to Malta, which took place from 11 to 16 June 1942. Vigorous was part of Operation Julius, a simultaneous operation with Operation Harpoon from Gibraltar and supporting operations. Sub-convoy MW11c sailed from Port Said (Egypt) on 11 June, to tempt the Italian battlefleet to sail early, use up fuel and be exposed to submarine and air attack. MW11a and MW11b sailed next day from Haifa, Port Said and Alexandria; one ship was sent back because of defects. Italian and German (Axis) aircraft attacked MW11c on 12 June and a damaged ship was diverted to Tobruk, just east of Gazala. The merchant ships and escorts rendezvoused on 13 June.

The convoy and escorts sailed through "Bomb Alley" between Crete and Cyrenaica under attack from Axis bombers, dive-bombers, torpedo-bombers, E-boats and submarines and were then threatened by the sailing of an Italian battlefleet from Taranto. The British relied on aircraft and submarines to repel the Italian fleet in the absence of battleships and aircraft carriers but only one heavy cruiser was sunk. When the Italian battleships were within  the British convoy and escorts were ordered to turn back and wait for the Italians to suffer losses from torpedo-bombers, bombers and submarines but little more damage was inflicted and after several more turns towards and away from Malta, the convoy and escorts returned to Alexandria on 16 June. The Battle of Gazala (26 May – 21 June) was being fought in Libya during Operation Julius and beginning on 14 June, the British defeat forced the Eighth Army to withdraw eastwards, losing landing grounds from which aircraft could provide air cover for MW11.

Operation Julius and the subsidiary Operation Vigorous were failures; only two merchant ships from Operation Harpoon, the simultaneous convoy from Gibraltar, reached Malta to deliver supplies. In the absence of air cover and the suppression of Axis air power lining the routes to Malta, the central Mediterranean had been closed to British ships. Malta could not be revived as an offensive base and to provide some aviation fuel for the defending fighters, the British resorted to the expedient of running supplies through the blockade by submarine. No more convoys were attempted from the eastern Mediterranean until the Eighth Army conquered Libya in October. A limited return to offensive operations was made against Axis convoys to Libya and Operation Pedestal in August delivered four merchant ships and an oil tanker from Gibraltar, which further revived Malta as an offensive base, despite the loss of most of the convoy and many naval ships.

Background

Malta

Siege, 1942

Axis bombing smashed the docks, ships, aircraft and airfields by the end of April 1942 and then the bombing was switched to targets preliminary to invasion: camps, barracks, warehouses and road junctions. After 18 April, German bombing suddenly stopped and Italian bombers took over, regularly bombing with small formations of aircraft. During the month, Axis aircraft flew more than  against  all but  fighter sorties. The bombing demolished or damaged   were killed and  wounded; good shelters existed but some casualties were caused by delayed-action bombs.

Three destroyers, three submarines, three minesweepers, five tugs, a water carrier and a floating crane were sunk in port and more ships damaged. The island continued to function as a staging post but the Axis bombing campaign neutralised Malta as an offensive base. Two boats of the 10th Submarine Flotilla had been sunk, two were damaged in harbour and on 26 April the flotilla was ordered out because of mining by small fast craft, which were undetectable by radar and inaudible during the bombing; the surviving minesweepers were too reduced in numbers to clear the approaches. Three reconnaissance aircraft remained and only  sorties were flown, eleven more by FAA aircraft during the month and by the start of June, only two Fairey Albacores and two Fairey Swordfish were left.

Offensive operations

From December 1941,  bombing neutralised Malta, British decrypts of Italian  cipher messages showed more sailings and fewer losses and on 23 February 1942, an Italian "battleship convoy" reached Tripoli. By the end of February,  had crossed without escort and an intelligence blackout caused by a change to the  machine in early March made little difference to the British for lack of means. After the British broke  again,  supply journeys had been made by May, only nine being spotted by air reconnaissance. On 14 April, five Malta aircraft were shot down and the submarine  was lost.

The Axis was able to reinforce North Africa sufficient for Rommel to try to attack before the British. In late April, the British Chiefs of Staff ruled that there would be no convoy to Malta in May, because the Italian fleet could be expected to sail and the convoy would need battleship and aircraft carrier cover, which was not available. An operation to fly Spitfires to Malta succeeded and anti-aircraft ammunition was to be supplied by fast minelayer, with which Malta would have to hold on until mid-June, when the situation in the Western Desert might be clearer. Should Martuba or Benghazi in Cyrenaica be captured by the Eighth Army, a westbound convoy from Alexandria might survive without cover from battleships and aircraft carriers. It would also be known if  aircraft had been diverted to the Russian Front and if the crisis in the Indian Ocean had abated, sufficient for ships to escort a fast convoy from Alexandria.

Gleanings from prisoners of war and diplomatic sources led to a certain apprehension about the meaning of troop movements in southern Italy. The absence of evidence from signals intelligence and air reconnaissance led to a conclusion that an invasion was not imminent but the need to protect the source of information meant that this was not disclosed by the British. That preparations were being made was revealed on 7 February through the decryption of  Enigma messages but by 23 March the scare died down and more bombing was expected. By 2 May, a  bomber group and a fighter group had been withdrawn with more to follow, which explained the lull. Hitler was lukewarm about the operation, in case the Italian navy left down German airborne forces but the capture of Tobruk in mid-June made it appear that the invasion was unnecessary. Hitler and Mussolini agreed to  pursuing the British into Egypt for the rest of June and into July, which meant cancelling Hercules.

Western Desert Campaign

The British misjudged the speed of Axis reinforcement and expected to attack well before the Axis but  forestalled the Eighth Army by beginning an offensive on 21 January 1942. By 6 February, the British had been defeated, forced to retreat east of the Jebel Akhdar back to the Gazala line just west of Tobruk, where  had begun its retirement seven weeks earlier. At the Battle of Gazala (26 May – 21 June),  attacked first again but appeared close to defeat until 11 June. Operation Julius began on the same day as the  broke out and by 14 June, forced the British to retreat towards Tobruk. The Axis then forces pursued the British into Egypt and the Desert Air Force lost the Libyan landing grounds from which to cover Malta convoys.

Prelude

Operation Julius

Two weeks before the convoys, the carrier  began operations to deliver 63 Spitfires to Malta, which increased the number to  fighters. Air operations for the two convoys began on 24 May, when Vickers Wellington bombers of 104 Squadron from Malta, began bombing airfields and ports in Sicily and southern Italy. On 11 June, the Wellingtons were withdrawn to accommodate six Wellington torpedo bombers of 38 Squadron, Bristol Beaufort torpedo-bombers of 217 Squadron and Martin Baltimore reconnaissance aircraft of 69 Squadron. Aircraft from Gibraltar, Malta and Egypt also began reconnaissance flights on 11 June, searching for the Italian fleet.

Short-range fighters based in Palestine, Egypt, Cyrenaica and Malta, were to provide air cover at first and as the convoy moved out of range, protection would be taken over by Curtiss Kittyhawks of 250 Squadron equipped with long-range fuel tanks, Bristol Beaufighters from 252 Squadron and 272 Squadron and Beaufighter night fighters from 227 Squadron. Air cover from Cyrenaica could not overlap with coverage from Malta leaving a gap but Wellingtons of 205 Group and the light bombers of the Desert Air Force would attack Axis airfields in North Africa. The coastal 201 Group would provide reconnaissance and anti-submarine sorties and a small sabotage party was to land on Crete to attack Axis aircraft on the ground.

Operation Vigorous

Vigorous was planned as a joint Royal Navy–RAF operation, to be conducted from the headquarters of 201 Naval Co-operation Group by Admiral Henry Harwood and Air Marshal Arthur Tedder, with Rear Admiral Philip Vian in command of the convoy and escorts (Force A). On 22 March 1942, in Operation  protecting convoy  to Malta, the Second Battle of Sirte between the Italian fleet and the British escorts had been fought. The British escorts had held off the Italian fleet for  hours but in the longer days of June, it was doubted that the feat could be repeated. If a larger Italian force attacked the convoy, Vian was to protect the convoy with smoke and the escorts were to repulse the attackers with torpedoes and try to inflict early casualties using gunfire against two of the Italian ships.

Bringing the battleship  and several aircraft carriers from the Eastern Fleet to reinforce the Mediterranean Fleet was considered but the danger of air attack was so great that it was rejected. The operation was to have  ten from the Eastern Fleet, four corvettes, two minesweepers to clear the Malta approaches, four Motor Torpedo Boats (MTB) and two rescue ships. The former battleship , which had been disarmed between the wars and used for training, was fitted with anti-aircraft guns and pressed into service to masquerade as an operational battleship. The 1st Submarine and 10th Submarine Flotilla were to send nine boats as a moving screen parallel to the convoy as it passed between Crete and Cyrenaica (Bomb Alley). On the days before and after, the submarines were to patrol areas that the Italian fleet was likely to be found.

Operation Harpoon

Operation Harpoon, the Operation Julius convoy eastbound from Gibraltar began on 4 June, with the departure from Scotland of five merchant ships as convoy WS19z. It had been being given out that the ships were bound for Malta via the Cape but the deception was exposed when  was ordered to assume a short voyage; the naval liaison officer, five signals staff and Navy gunners on board each merchant ship also left little to the imagination. Force H consisted of a battleship, two aircraft carriers, three cruisers and eight destroyers. Off the Italian coast,  were to patrol, ready to ambush Italian ships.

A shortage of oil limited Italian naval operations but the accumulation of ships at Alexandria and decrypted wireless messages from Colonel Bonner Fellers, the US Military attaché in Cairo (the good source), alerted the  that convoys were about to be run from Alexandria and Gibraltar to Malta.  the navy high command, planned a counter-operation against both convoys and nine submarines were sent to patrol off the Algerian coast, five between Lampedusa and Malta and five east of Malta in the Ionian Sea. The main Italian battlefleet was reserved for the eastbound convoy from Alexandria.

Convoy

11 June

To camouflage preparations, the eleven merchantmen were loaded at Alexandria, Port Said, Suez, Haifa and Beirut, rendezvousing at Port Said and Haifa. Secrecy led to a lack of practice for the military passengers who made up damage control and fire-fighting parties and some defects in the ships' guns went unnoticed. The Port Said ships Aagtekirk, Bhutan, City of Calcutta and Rembrandt of MW11c, sailed  early in the afternoon of 11 June, in Operation Rembrandt, each towing an MTB. Escorted by Coventry and eight s, MW11c was to simulate the Malta convoy and steam about as far as the Tobruk meridian and turn back to rendezvous with the remainder. It was hoped that the decoy operation would lure out the Italian fleet, which would be exposed to attack and run short of fuel before the main convoy sailed. During the night five of the freighters for Operation Harpoon rendezvoused with the tanker Kentucky off Gibraltar; by morning GM4 was making  to the east.

12 June

Convoy MW-11a of Ajax, City of Edinburgh, City of Pretoria, City of Lincoln and Elizabeth Bakke sailed from Haifa and Port Said on 12 June, escorted by the 7th Destroyer Flotilla of Napier, Norman, Nizam, Inconstant and Hotspur, with fleet minesweepers Boston and Seaham. MW11b sailed from Alexandria with Potaro, the tanker Bulkoil, the decommissioned battleship Centurion carrying supplies and operating as a decoy, the rescue ships Malines and Antwerp, escorted by five destroyers and four corvettes. During the evening, MW11c was attacked from Crete by  bombers of I  and City of Calcutta was damaged by a near-miss. During the short night, MW11c turned back to rendezvous off Alexandria with the rest of MW11 the next day and the Hunts put in to refuel. Operation Harpoon was undisturbed because  suspected that it was a decoy.

13 June

The three convoy elements met off Mersa Matruh during the afternoon and made for Malta as the 7th Destroyer Flotilla put into Alexandria to refuel, the rest of the destroyers sailing on and the rest leaving Alexandria with the main force, seven cruisers and their destroyer screen. During the afternoon, the weather deteriorated and the MTBs on tow were cast off to return to Alexandria but MTB 259 was damaged and sunk, the rest made port the next day. The activity of raiding parties was reported to Washington by Bonner Fellers; three SBS parties had landed the week previous, one to attack the aircraft but had not been able to penetrate the airfield security.

After dark, Axis aircraft continuously illuminated the convoy with flares and dropped occasional bombs, then at  the  attacked the main escort force catching up from the east, dropping more bombs and flares until British fighters arrived after dawn. Douglas Bostons and Wellington bombers attacked Axis airfields near Derna and other places during the night, to interfere with Axis air operations against the convoy. Two Italian cruisers and three destroyers departed Cagliari during the evening for Palermo, ready to stop a fast ship from dashing to Malta.

14 June

Dust storms in Libya grounded day bombers until the evening and most of the aircraft based in Libya that flew operated over Vigorous. The convoy escorts reorganised, the four corvettes, two minesweepers and the 5th Destroyer Flotilla with nine destroyers being joined by  destroyers of the 2nd, 7th, 12th, 14th and 22nd flotillas. Aagtekirk, Erica and Primula developed engine-trouble, Erica was sent to Mersa Matruh and the other two to Tobruk, escorted by Tetcott. About forty Junkers Ju 87  dive-bombers and Junkers Ju 88 medium bombers bombed Tetcott and the rest attacked Aagtekirk, which was hit and caught fire as three bombers were shot down. The rest of the convoy was covered by Hawker Hurricanes and Kittyhawks diverted from the Battle of Gazala, which protected the convoy from a big force of bombers.

During the afternoon  was more circumspect until the convoy was beyond the cover of the short-range British fighters, then from  about  made seven attacks in five hours, opposed by a few long-range Kittyhawks and Beaufighters. The eight merchantmen were in four columns around the rescue ships, with the cruisers about  out, the Hunt class destroyers  beyond and the fleet destroyers on anti-submarine patrol  outside the Hunts. The formation was effective against torpedo-bombers but risked attack by dive-bombers in the absence of British fighters. At  about  attacked Bulkoil and Bhutan from the flank and near-missed Bulkoil and Potaro which took on water. After the rescue Antwerp and Malines were directed to Tobruk where the serious cases were transferred to a hospital ship and then they sailed for Alexandria, Tobruk being under artillery bombardment by Axis guns and arrived at  next day.

The torpedo missed but the attack on the submarine was cancelled, when torpedo boats were seen to the north-west. British fighters were ordered to engage but were bounced by Bf 109s escorting the E-boats. The worst of the bombing stopped once dark fell and desultory bombing and flare dropping resumed like the night before. The escort force moved into night formation, the fleet destroyers moving into line ahead of the convoy, two cruisers and four destroyers on the port and starboard quarters and a destroyer at each corner of the formation  out. The flare-dropping deterred the E-boats from coming too close but the convoy and escort crews were very tired and much of the anti-aircraft ammunition of the convoy and escorts had been expended.

At  Harwood signalled Vian that the Italian fleet (Admiral Angelo Iachino) with two battleships, two heavy and two light cruisers and  had sailed from Taranto and would reach the convoy by  Vian requested permission to turn back as it would be impossible for the escorts to protect the merchantmen for another long summer day and Harwood ordered Vigorous to continue towards Malta until  on 15 June, then turn onto a reciprocal course. At Gazala, the Eighth Army began to withdraw, after it had been defeated in the fighting from  leaving a garrison inside Tobruk; both sides sent aircraft to Vigorous, which gave a respite to the armies. Operation Harpoon came into range of the  bombers and  based in Sardinia. Fighter-bombers attacked first then bombers and torpedo-bombers at the same time which sank a merchant ship and damaged a cruiser. As the convoy came within range of Sicily, ten  Ju 88s joined in but the early attacks were defeated, seven British and  aircraft being lost.

Night, 14/15 June

The turn order was given at  a hazardous manoeuvre for a large group of ships out of position, full of tired crews and menaced by Axis torpedo-boats and U-boats. As the sun rose, MW11 was heading east and at  four Wellington torpedo-bombers from Malta found the Italian fleet, dropped flares and attacked but the ships made smoke and only one Wellington dropped torpedoes. At the same time, nine 217 Squadron Beauforts took off from Malta, reached the Italians as dawn broke and the first three Beauforts attacked  at  achieving one torpedo hit, as two bombers pressed on through the destroyer and cruiser screen to the battleships, mistakenly claiming two hits.  came to a standstill after the torpedo struck the cruiser amidships. Force W, covering Operation Harpoon, turned back during the night and the convoy proceeded with the close escorts of Force X. The Italian cruisers and seven destroyers at Palermo sailed at dusk.

15 June

Morning
The British torpedo attack came when the Italian battlefleet was passing through the area of the 10th Submarine Flotilla, after the plan to form a line north of the track of the convoy had been overtaken by events after the Italian battleships sailed and the convoy turned back.  (Lieutenant S. L. C. Maydon) picked up the Italian ships on hydrophone and steered towards the fleet as the torpedo-bombers dropped illumination flares. Maydon found that Umbra was

(Lieutenant J. B. de B. Kershaw) briefly sighted the battlefleet but was too far away to attack. Umbra, Uproar and Ultimatum turned towards the immobilised  and at  Umbra hit  with two torpedoes, the ship sinking an hour later.

Bf 109s and MC 202s based near Gazala intercepted the  shot down two and damaged five which turned back (one failing to return). Near the Italian battlefleet, two more Beauforts were damaged by long-range anti-aircraft fire at about  but by turning broadside to bring more guns to bear, the Italian ships presented bigger targets, the Beaufort crews claiming a hit on a battleship and the US crews above reporting hits on a cruiser and a destroyer, although all torpedoes missed; the Beauforts turned for Malta and landed at Luqa, the damaged leader crash-landing.

The combined HQ at Alexandria received reports only after long delays and during the night, Harwood became more apprehensive that the convoy would soon sail back into Bomb Alley and ordered another turn at  Vian was then ordered to avoid the Italians until aircraft had attacked around  If the attack failed, Vian was to get the convoy to Malta and if the Italian ships intercepted, the merchant ships were to be abandoned to their fate, the escorts escaping in any direction. At  reconnaissance reports showed that the battlefleet was still making south,  from the convoy and at  Harwood ordered the ships to reverse course again. It was only at  that Harwood and Tedder discovered that aircraft from Malta had engaged the Italian battlefleet and received the exaggerated claims of torpedo hits, including those on the battleships. Harwood signalled that MW11 should turn for Malta again, the escorts to abandon the freighters if challenged and then at  delegated freedom of action to Vian. At dawn, the ships of Operation Harpoon were intercepted by an Italian cruiser force and the five British fleet destroyers boldly attacked as the smaller destroyers remained with the convoy and eventually the Italian ships broke off the attack at  Air attacks on the convoy had continued, two ships were damaged and one sunk. The Italian cruisers reappeared, fired on a previously disabled destroyer, which had been taken in tow by an escort destroyer; the crippled ship was left adrift, and eventually torpedoed and sunk by an aircraft. The damaged merchant ships were scuttled or abandoned by their escorts. The rest of the convoy sailed into a minefield, a destroyer hit a mine and sank, the two surviving merchantmen and the remaining escorts reaching Malta that night.

Afternoon

The  order from Harwood to turn for Malta reached Vian at  but Axis bombers had attacked from  when  attacked. Most of the Ju 87s  dive-bombers attacked the escorts but City of Edinburgh and City of Pretoria was near-missed and slightly damaged, City of Edinburgh claiming a bomber and a probable. The other 24  attacked the merchant ships with no result and Centurion, which survived and shot down a bomber.

The Italian ships were close to contact but  ordered Iachino to turn away when only  from the convoy if the British had not been engaged by  At  the battlefleet turned north-west, towards Navarino (Pylos) ready to advance should the British try again. MW11 was under attack when the signal arrived and after waiting for two hours for a reply, Harwood ordered that only the four fastest merchantmen, Arethusa and two destroyers should make a dash for Malta. Three ships received near misses but radar directed anti-aircraft fire in the growing darkness made the attackers cautious. At  Ju 88s attacked in a shallow dive, near-missed Arethusa and Centurion and badly damaged Nestor. The SM 79s attacked after one had been shot down by two Beaufighters and three more were shot down by ships' gunners, along with two bombers.

Evening

Night, 15/16 and 16 June

At   ( Franz-Georg Reschke) got through the anti-submarine cordon around MW11 and torpedoed Hermione, which heeled over and sank with  killed and about  Two air attacks were made on Nestor and its escorts and at  the tow parted for the second time; with dawn due and the long summer day to follow, the captain of the Australian destroyer Nestor decided that the risk to the other destroyers was too great and had Nestor sunk at  The other destroyers caught up with the convoy during the afternoon. City of Calcutta sailed from Tobruk with Tetcott and Primula and more attempts by U-boats to attack MW11 failed, the convoy reaching Alexandria that evening. Centurion was too deep in the water and waited at the Great Pass as the five remaining merchantmen entered port. Bulkoil and Ajax were escorted to Port Said by four destroyers.

Aftermath

Analysis

In 1960, Ian Playfair, the British official historian wrote that the relationship of the "battle for supplies" with the land war reached a climax in the second half of 1942. Far from the Eighth Army capturing airfields to the west in the Cyrenaican bulge, it had been defeated at Gazala while Operation Julius was on and lost the landing grounds to the east. The disaster at Gazala had led to the military forces on Malta trying to save Egypt rather than vice versa. MW11 had been a "disappointing operation" and turned back because the British and US air attacks on the Italian battlefleet had failed to inflict the damage hoped. Force A could not hope to defeat it in a surface action, a view echoed by Greene and Massignani in 2003. By the time that the Italian battleships had been ordered back, the convoy and escorts lacked the ammunition to continue and seven long-range Beaufighters had been lost, depriving Vigorous of air cover while beyond the reach of short-range fighters. Communications had been inadequate, with some signals taking too long to arrive but Playfair wrote that without airfields in the west of Cyrenaica, even quick and accurate reports would not have compensated. Six freighters in Vigorous and Harpoon had been sunk and nine forced to return to port. Two ships of Operation Harpoon reached Malta and delivered  of supplies, which with a decent harvest might keep the population of Malta fed until September but the depletion of aviation fuel led to fighters being give priority over the offensive force. Transit flights through Malta except for Beaufort torpedo bombers was suspended, only close range air attacks on easy targets were to be permitted and fuel for the fighters was to be carried to Malta by submarine.

In 1962, the British naval official historian Stephen Roskill called the Axis success undeniable. No attempt was made to run another convoy from Alexandria until the Eighth Army had conquered Libya. Roskill wrote that with hindsight, the course of events on land made naval operations in the central Mediterranean inherently dangerous and during the operation, the withdrawal of the Eighth Army lost one of the airfields being used for air cover. Harwood was right that the bomber and torpedo-bomber force was too small and had not compensated for the lack of battleships and with Axis aircraft based along the length of the route to Malta, air power had decided the course of events. On land, the diversion of Axis bombers against the convoys had been of some benefit to the British as they conducted the "scuttle" to El Alamein. In 1941  merchant ships sailing for Malta arrived but in the first seven months of 1942, of the  that sailed, ten were sunk, ten were turned back damaged, three were sunk on arrival and seven delivered their supplies.

In 2003, Richard Woodman wrote that the 14 June order from Harwood, for the convoy to continue west before turning back, showed indecision and a lack of strategic sense, risking valuable merchant ships in the hope that British submarine and air attacks might enable the convoy to proceed. Vigorous had been an "imperial balls-up" and the retreat to Alexandria an Axis victory, showing that Britain had lost control of the central Mediterranean. On 16 June, Harwood reported that

In a later report, Harwood blamed the RAF for its inability to provide a sufficient number of aircraft capable of defeating the Italian battle fleet. The only success in Operation Julius was the arrival of two of the Harpoon ships at Malta; on land, Tobruk surrendered a few days after MW11 returned to port and by late June, the Eighth Army had retreated to El Alamein.

Casualties

The cruiser Hermione, destroyers Airedale, Hasty and Nestor and two merchant ships were sunk during Operation Vigorous; three cruisers, a destroyer and a corvette were damaged. British aircraft and submarines sank the cruiser  and damaged ; anti-aircraft gunners on the escorts and merchant ships shot down  about  aircraft. Two destroyers were sunk during Operation Harpoon, a cruiser, three destroyers and a minesweeper were damaged, an Italian destroyer was slightly damaged, the RAF lost five aircraft, the FAA seven and claimed  aircraft.

Subsequent operations

During July, the submarines  and  delivered aviation fuel, ammunition and other stores; another  were flown off Eagle during sorties on 15 and 21 July. Welshman made its third trip and arrived on 16 July; at the end of the month the 10th Submarine Flotilla returned and the minesweepers with Harpoon had reduced the mine danger in the Malta approaches. Early in July Axis bombers had dropped another  of bombs, mainly on airfields, destroyed  on the ground and damaged many others. Later in July, the greater number of British fighters at Malta justified a return to intercepting raids further out to sea, which had great success.

Operation Pedestal  was another British operation to carry supplies to Malta. Despite many losses, enough supplies were delivered by the British for the population and military forces on Malta to resist, although it had ceased to be an offensive base. Pedestal was a costly tactical defeat for the Allies, the last Axis Mediterranean victory and one of the greatest British strategic victories of the war. The cargo of aviation fuel in Ohio revitalised the Malta-based air offensive against Axis shipping. After Pedestal, submarines returned to Malta and Supermarine Spitfires flown from the aircraft-carrier  enabled a maximum effort to be made against Axis ships. Italian convoys had to be routed further away from the island, lengthening the journey and increasing the time during which air and naval attacks could be mounted. The Siege of Malta was broken by the Second Battle of El Alamein (23 October – 11 November) and Operation Torch (8–16 November) in the western Mediterranean, which enabled land-based aircraft to escort merchant ships to the island.

Orders of battle
 † - ships sunk
 # - ships damaged, ## - heavily damaged
 Ship data taken from Woodman 2003, unless indicated.

Allies

Cruisers
 Light cruisers
  ##,  #, †, 
 Light cruiser (AA)
 

Destroyers
 2nd Destroyer Flotilla
 5th Destroyer Flotilla (Hunt-class destroyer escorts):
 7th Destroyer Flotilla
 12th Destroyer Flotilla
 14th Destroyer Flotilla
 22nd Destroyer Flotilla
 , †, 

Corvettes

Minesweepers
 , 

Motor Torpedo Boats
 MTB-259†, MTB-261, MTB-262, MTB-264

Rescue ships
 Antwerp, Malines

Auxiliary ship (decommissioned battleship)
 

Submarines

Merchantmen
 MW-11A: Ajax, City of Edinburgh, City of Lincoln, m.v. City of Pretoria, Elizabeth Bakke
 MW-11B: tankers Bulkoil, Potaro #
 MW-11C: Aagtekirk†, Bhutan†, City of Calcutta #, Rembrandt

Italian

Battleships
  #, 

Heavy cruisers
 †, 

Light cruisers
 , 

Destroyers

See also
 Battle of the Mediterranean
 Bonner Fellers
 Malta Convoys

Notes

Footnotes

References

Further reading

External links
 Operation Vigorous Arnold Hague Convoy Database (Shorter Convoy Series)
 Campaign summary of Malta Convoys
 RN submarines site
 HMS Grove, escort destroyer

Malta Convoys
Naval battles of World War II involving Italy
Naval battles of World War II involving the United States
Naval battles and operations of World War II involving the United Kingdom
Naval battles of World War II involving Australia
Naval battles of World War II involving Germany
Aerial operations and battles of World War II involving the United Kingdom
1942 in Malta
Conflicts in 1942
Naval aviation operations and battles
Italian naval victories in the battle of the Mediterranean
June 1942 events

it:Battaglia di mezzo giugno